Dairi Regency is a regency on the west shore of Lake Toba in North Sumatra, Indonesia.  The regency covers an area of  square kilometres and it had a population of 269,848 people at the 2010 Census and 308,764 at the 2020 Census. Its seat is at the town of Sidikalang.

Geography and climate	

It has a tropical rainforest climate, with the heaviest rainfall between September and May.

Dairi is bordered on its north by Southeast Aceh and Karo, to its south by Pakpak Bharat, to its east by Toba, and to its west by South Aceh.

Demographics 

A 2008 estimate by the Dairi government put Dairi's population at 271,983, with a sex ratio of 99.43. Of the population, 39.96% is under the age of 14. At the 2010 Census the population was 269,848, and at the 2020 Census it was 308,764.

Administrative districts 
Dairi Regency is divided into fifteen districts (kecamatan), tabulated below with their areas and their populations at the 2010 Census and the 2020 Census. The table also includes the locations of the district administrative centres, the number of administrative villages (desa and kelurahan) in each district and its post code.

These districts in turn comprise 169 administrative villages (desa and kelurahan).

Coat of arms
The coat of arms of Dairi has many connotations. Indonesia's date of independence, 17 August 1945, is indicated by the 17-budded cotton plant on the left side, 8 rattan branches in the center, and 45 seeds of rice on a stalk to the right. The shield in the centre is divided into five, four parts indicating different cash crops important to the area (benzoin resin, coffee, tobacco and patchouli), while the fifth shows a traditional Pakpak Batak house; the house signifies protection. The five point star in the top center signifies the Pancasila-respecting habits of the Dairi people, while the mountains represent tranquility and the chains represent gotong royong, or cooperating and collaborating. The central sharpened bamboo spear represents the Dairi people's struggle for independence.

History

Prior to the arrival of the Dutch East India Company, the people of what is now Dairi lived in traditional adat-regulated communities, with unelected local leaders. After the arrival of the Dutch they established an ethnic-Dutch controleur to be in charge of the Dairi onder afdeling, as well as a native Indonesian demang, or lieutenant.

After Indonesia's independence, the residents attempted to build a foundation for a new government. However, after the Dutch army recaptured nearby East Sumatra in 1947, they chose a new leader for the Dairi area. Another leader was chosen in 1949; later that year, after the Netherlands and Indonesia signed an agreement for Indonesian independence

Economy
Farming is a large business in Dairi. Major crops in Dairi are coffee, both robusta and arabica, corn, and potatoes. Approximately 6,770 tonnes of robusta coffee are produced every year, in addition to 2,639 tonnes of arabica; corn fields take up 63% of suitable farming land. Other minor trades are damar collecting, fish farming, and rattan.

References 
Footnotes

Bibliography
 
 
 
 
 
 
 

Regencies of North Sumatra